Nieuwesluis is a hamlet in the Dutch province of North Holland.

Nieuwesluis is considered part of Wieringerwaard. It has place name signs.

References

Populated places in North Holland
Hollands Kroon